Lower Carniola is a traditional region in Slovenia, the southeastern part of the historical Carniola region.

Geography
Lower Carniola is delineated by the Ljubljana Basin with the city of Ljubljana to the northwest, by the Kolpa River and the border with Croatia with the Gorjanci Mountains to the south and southeast, by the Sava River to the north and northeast, and by Mount Krim, the Bloke Plateau, and the Potok Plateau to the west. The southernmost region down to the border with Croatia on the Kolpa River is called White Carniola and usually considered part of Lower Carniola.

The historic centre of Lower Carniola is Novo Mesto, and other towns include Kočevje, Grosuplje, Krško, Trebnje, Mirna, Črnomelj, Semič, and Metlika.

History

In the 17th century, the Habsburg duchy of Carniola was internally divided into three administrative districts. This division was thoroughly described by the scholar Johann Weikhard von Valvasor in his 1689 work The Glory of the Duchy of Carniola. The districts were known in German as Kreise (kresija in old Slovene). They were: Upper Carniola with its centre in Ljubljana (formerly Kranj), comprising the northern areas of the duchy; Inner Carniola comprising the southwest, with its centre in Postojna, and Lower Carniola in the southeast, roughly corresponding to the medieval Windic March of the Holy Roman Empire. While the bulk of the population spoke Slovene, the German-speaking exclave of the Gottschee Germans existed around Kočevje in the south.

This division remained, in various arrangements, up to the 1860s, when the old administrative districts were abolished and Lower Carniola was subdivided into the smaller Bezirke of Novo Mesto (Rudolfswert), Kočevje (Gottschee), and Krško (Gurkfeld). Nevertheless, the regional identity remained strong also thereafter. Upon the dissolution of Austria-Hungary after World War I, Carniola was incorporated first into the State of Slovenes, Croats and Serbs and then into the Kingdom of Serbs, Croats and Slovenes and it ceased to exist as a separate political and geographical unit. The Carniolan regional identity soon faded away, but the regional identification with its sub-units (Upper Carniola, Lower Carniola, and, to a lesser extent, Inner Carniola) remain strong.

Since the 1890s, Lower Carniola has become significantly more connected with the surrounding regions through the construction of the Ljubljana–Novo Mesto Railway (1894), Sevnica–Trebnje Railway (1908, 1938), and the Brotherhood and Unity Highway (1958) linking Ljubljana and Zagreb. In the early 21st century the Brotherhood and Unity Highway was replaced with the modern A2 motorway (completed in 2011).

Culture 
Since 2013, Woodland pristava, an annual electronic dance music festival,has been held at the Pristava in Stična.

Image gallery

See also
 Lower Carniolan dialect group
 Gottscheerish
 Southeast Slovenia Statistical Region

References

External links

 
Subdivisions of Carniola
Historical regions in Slovenia